Scull  may refer to:

Boat propulsion and boats
 Scull, a kind of oar used in sculling, a form of rowing, a technique to propel watercraft 
 Single scull, double scull, quad scull, types of rowing boat 
 Stern sculling, a method of using a single oar over the stern to propel a boat

People and places
 Antonio Scull, (born 1965), first baseman with Industriales of the Cuban National Series
 Christina Scull, researcher and writer best known for her books about the works of J. R. R. Tolkien
 Edward Scull (1818–1900), Republican member of the U.S. House of Representatives from Pennsylvania
 Scull Shoals, Georgia, a ghost town in Greene County, United States

See also
 Skull (disambiguation), a homophone
 SCUL, the Subversive Choppers Urban Legion, a Boston-based modified bicycle group